Romanichal Travellers (more commonly known as English Gypsies, White Gypsies, or English Travellers) are a Romani subgroup within the United Kingdom and other parts of the English-speaking world. There are an estimated 200,000 Romani in the United Kingdom; almost all live in England. Most Romanichal speak Angloromani, a mixed language that blends Romani vocabulary with English syntax.

Etymology
The word "Romanichal" is derived from Romani chal, where chal is Angloromani for "fellow".

Distribution
Nearly all Romanichal Travellers in Britain live in England, with smaller communities in South Wales, Northeast Wales, and the Scottish Borders.

The Romanichal diaspora emigrated from Great Britain to other parts of the English-speaking world. Based on some estimates, there are now more people of Romanichal descent in the United States than in Britain. 

In Great Britain, there is a sharp north–south divide between Romanichal Travellers. Southern Romanichal Travellers live in the Southeast, Southwest, Midlands, East Anglia, and South Wales, and Northern Romanichal Travellers live in the Northwest, Yorkshire, Scottish Borders, and Northeast of Wales. The two groups' dialects differ in accent and vocabulary.

Language

The Romani people in England are thought to have spoken the Romani language until the 19th century, when it was replaced by English and Angloromani, a creole language that combines the syntax and grammar of English with the Romani lexicon. Most Romanichals also speak English.

There are two dialects of Angloromani: Southern Angloromani (spoken in the Southeast, Southwest, Midlands, East Anglia, and South Wales) and Northern Angloromani (spoken in the Northeast, Northwest, Yorkshire, Scottish Borders, and Northeast of Wales). These two dialects, along with the accents that accompany them, have led to two regional Romanichal Traveller identities forming, these being the Southern Romanichal identity and the Northern Romanichal Traveller identity.

Many Angloromani words have been incorporated into English, particularly in the form of British slang.

History

The Romani people have origins in the Indian subcontinent, specifically Rajasthan, and began migrating westwards in the 11th century. The first groups of Romani people arrived in Great Britain by the end of the 16th century, escaping conflicts in Southeastern Europe (such as the Ottoman conquest of the Balkans).

In 1506, there are recorded Romani persons in Scotland originating from Spain, and coming to England in 1512. Rulers soon passed laws aimed at stopping the immigration of Romani and enforcing the assimilation of those already present.

During the reign of Henry VIII, the Egyptians Act of 1530 banned Romanies from entering the country and required those already living there to leave within sixteen days. Failure to do so could result in confiscation of property, imprisonment, and deportation. During the reign of Mary I, the Act was amended by the Egyptians Act of 1554, which removed the threat of punishment if Romanies abandoned their "naughty, idle and ungodly life and company" and adopted a sedentary lifestyle, but increased the penalty for non-compliance to death.

In 1562, a new law offered Romanies born in England and Wales the possibility of becoming English subjects if they assimilated into the local population. Despite this new option, the Romani were forced into a marginal lifestyle and subjected to discrimination by the authorities and by many non-Romani. In 1596, 106 men and women were condemned to death at York for being Romani, and nine were executed.<ref name="Timbers2016">{{cite book|last=Timbers|first=Frances|title=The Damned Fraternitie: Constructing Gypsy Identity in Early Modern England, 1500–1700|url=https://books.google.com/books?id=Sh4FDAAAQBAJ&pg=PT96|date=20 April 2016|publisher=Routledge|isbn=978-1-317-03651-7|page=96}}</ref> Samuel Rid wrote two books about them in the early 17th century.

From the 1780s onwards, the anti-Romani laws were gradually repealed. The identity of the Romanichals was formed between 1660 and 1800, as a Romani group living in Britain.

Persecution

Hostility and discrimination against Romani people is still present in the UK. In 2008, it was reported that the Romani experienced a higher degree of racism than any other group in the United Kingdom, including asylum-seekers, and a Mori poll indicated that a third of UK residents admitted to being prejudiced against Romani.

Deportations
The authorities began to deport Romanichals, principally to Norway, as early as 1544. The process was continued and encouraged by Elizabeth I and James I.

The Finnish Kale, a Romani group in Finland, maintain that their ancestors were originally a Romani group who travelled from Scotland, supporting the idea that they and some of the Scandinavian Travellers/Romani are distantly related to Scottish Romani and English Romanichals. cited in: Fraser (1995)

In 1603, an Order in Council was made for the transportation of Romanichal to the Low Countries, France, Newfoundland, Spain, and the West Indies. In many cases, those deported in this manner lost contact with other members of their ethnic group because of the separations after the round-up, the sea passage, and the subsequent settlement as slaves. At the same time, voluntary emigration began to the English overseas possessions. Romani groups that survived continued their expression of the Romani culture there.

In the years following the American War of Independence, Australia was the preferred destination for penal transportation of Romanichal. The exact number of Romanichal deported to Australia is unknown. It has been suggested that three Romanichal were carried by the First Fleet, one of whom is thought to have been James Squire, who founded Australia's first commercial brewery in 1798, and whose grandson, James Farnell, became the first native-born premier of New South Wales in 1877. The total Romani population of Australia seems to have been extremely low, reflecting the fact that British Romani people probably made up just 0.01 per cent of the original convict population of 162,000. However, it has been suggested that Romanichal were  discriminated against under the transportation laws and may well have been undercounted. Fragmentary records suggest that at least fifty British Romanies may have been transported to Australia. It has been suggested that transportation was particularly harsh for Romanies:

For Romani convicts, transportation meant social and psychological death; exiled, they had little hope of returning to England to re-establish family ties, cultural roots, continuous expression, and validation that would have revived their Romani identity in the convict era.

At least one Romany returned from Australia to England: Henry Lavello (or Lovell) was repatriated with a full pardon and was accompanied to England by a son born to an Aboriginal woman.

Indentured labour and slavery
In the 17th century, Oliver Cromwell's government shipped Romanichals as indentured labourers to plantations in North America. From a later period, there is documentation of English Romanichal being enslaved by freed blacks in Jamaica, Barbados, Cuba and Louisiana.

Culture

Historically, Romanichals earned a living doing agricultural work and would move to the edges of towns for the winter months. There was casual work available on farms throughout the spring, summer, and autumn months. Spring would start with seed sowing and planting potatoes and fruit trees, early summer with weeding, and summer to late autumn with the harvesting of crops. Of particular significance was the hop industry, which employed thousands of Romanichals both in spring for vine training and for the harvest in early autumn. Winter months were often spent doing casual labour in towns or selling goods or services door to door.

Mass industrialisation of agriculture in the 1960s led to the disappearance of many of the casual farm jobs Romanichals had traditionally carried out.

Traditional economic activities include gardening and groundwork, fortune telling, hawking, selling, and collecting scrap. They have also produced notable boxers such as Henry Wharton and Billy Joe Saunders, as well as some notable footballers like Freddy Eastwood.

A didicoy (Angloromani; didikai, also diddicoy, diddykai) is a person of mixed Romany and Gorger (non-Romanichal) blood.

Travel

Originally, Romanichals would travel on foot or with light, horse-drawn carts, and would build bender tents where they settled for a time, as is typical of other Romani groups. A bender is a type of tent constructed from a frame of bent hazel branches (hazel is chosen for its straightness and flexibility), covered with canvas or tarpaulin.

Around the mid- to late-19th century, Romanichals started using wagons that incorporated living spaces on the inside. These they called "vardos" and were often brightly and colorfully decorated on the inside and outside. In the present day, Romanichals are more likely to live in caravans or houses.

Over 60% of 21st-century Romanichal families live in houses of bricks and mortar, whilst the remaining 40% still live in various forms of traditional Traveller modes of transport, such as caravans, trailers, or static caravans (a small minority still live in vardos).

According to the Regional Spatial Strategy caravan count for 2008, there were 13,386 caravans owned by Romani in the West Midlands region of England, whilst a further 16,000 lived in bricks and mortar. Of the 13,386 caravans, 1,300 were parked on unauthorised sites (that is, on land where Romani were not given permission to park).
Over 90% of Britain's travelling Romanichals live on authorised sites where they pay full rates (council tax).

On most Romanichal Traveller sites, there are usually no toilets or showers inside caravans because in Romanichal culture, this is considered unclean, or mochadi. Most sites have separate utility blocks with toilets, sinks, and electric showers. Many Romanichals will not do their laundry inside, especially not underwear, and subsequently many utility blocks also have washing machines. In the days of horse-drawn wagons and vardos, Romanichal women would do their laundry in a river, being careful to wash upper-body garments further upstream from underwear and lower-body garments, and personal bathing would take place much further downstream. In some modern trailers, a double wall separates the living areas from the toilet and shower.

Due to the Caravan Sites Act 1968, which greatly reduced the number of caravans allowed to be pitched on authorised sites, many Romanichals cannot find legal places on sites with the rest of their families.

Like most itinerant groups, Romanichals travel around for work, usually following set routes and set stopping places (called atching tans) that have been established for hundreds of years. Many traditional stopping places were established before land ownership changed and any land laws were in place. Many atching tans were established by feudal landowners in the Middle Ages, when Romani would provide agricultural or manual labour services in return for lodgings and food.

Today, most Romani travel within the same areas that were established generations ago. Most people can trace their presence in an area back over a hundred or two hundred years. Many traditional stopping places were taken over by local governments or by settled individuals decades ago and have subsequently changed hands numerous times; however, Romani have long historical connections to such places and do not always willingly give them up. Most families are identifiable by their traditional wintering base, where they will stop travelling for the winter, and this place will be technically where a family is 'from'.Gypsies and Travellers | Nottinghamshire County CouncilGYPSY & TRAVELLERS IN BRITAIN – HISTORY TIMELINE

See also
 Gordon Boswell Romany Museum
 Jumping the broom (Romani people)
 List of Romanichals
 List of Romanichal-related depictions and documentaries
 Gypsy Cob
 Gypsy Lore Society

Groups:
 Romani people
 Welsh Kale
 Finnish Kale
 Norwegian and Swedish Travellers
 Scottish Gypsy and Traveller groups
 Irish Travellers

References

External links
 'Gypsies' in the United States
 Salo, M., 'Romnichel economic and social organization in urban New England, 1850–1930,' in Salo, M. ed. Urban Gypsies, special issue of Urban Anthropology'', 2.3/4 (1982), 273-313
 Romani Cymru Project (Wales UK) -  An archival Initiative of Sipsi Cymreig, Welsh Gypsies
 
 Romanichal Gypsies (Threatened Cultures) by Thomas Acton

 
Romani groups